Iona College is an independent Roman Catholic single-sex day school for boys, located in the Brisbane suburb of Wynnum West (in an area previously known as Lindum), in Queensland, Australia. Iona is operated by the Oblates of Mary Immaculate, a religious order that was founded in 1816 by Saint Eugene de Mazenod.

History
On 1 October 1957, Father Tim Long and Father Denis McCarthy arrived on the hill at Lindum in an old second-hand Vauxhall, with only five pounds in cash, a gift of blankets, sheets and towels from the Oblate parish of Eagle Junction and a 'Mass Kit' from the Mercy Sisters at All Hallows School. With the help of local residents providing resources to help establish the College, it commenced on 28 January 1958 with 58 students and four staff members.

Iona College's name is taken from the Scottish island of Iona, the birthplace of Celtic Christianity in Scotland.

In 1961, Father Tim Long suffered a heart attack in London while making his way back to Ireland at the age of 65.

In 2015, Michael Twigg O.M.I. was appointed rector of the College.

In 2019, the Board and Oblates appointed Trevor Goodwin as the first principal of Iona.

There are two other schools run by the OMI in Australia: Mazenod College, Victoria and Mazenod College, Western Australia.

Arms, motto and colours 
The College colours are black and white. The College crest consists of a shield on which is depicted an arm holding a cross, while underneath is the Latin phrase "In Hoc Signo Vinces", which translates to "In This Sign You Will Conquer".

Campus 
The college is situated on 63 hectares and the campus includes such facilities as:

 A performing arts centre (IPAC)
 4 basketball courts – indoor and outdoor
 Indoor Volleyball courts
 7 cricket / rugby / soccer / athletics ovals
 An Olympic sized swimming pool
 A fully equipped gymnasium and weights room
 6 new tennis courts in the Iona Tennis Centre and Barton Family Show Courts
 Industrial Design and Technology Centre
 Art Precinct.
Indoor Sports Precinct (under construction)

In total the school has 26 different blocks with a chapel, a staff and priests' house.

Iona College has an outdoor education centre called "Glendalough" near Peregian Beach on the Sunshine Coast. Most year levels visit the camp every year. The site has an area of 19 hectares and Glendalough is close to the southern shores of Lake Weyba, one of the large shallow lakes of the region. Double kayaks are provided for use on the lake. Other nearby activities include climbs of Mt Coolum and Mt Peregian, the environmental walk at Stumer’s Creek Reserve and numerous local patrolled surf beaches.

Performing Arts Centre and cultural activities 
The Iona College Performing Arts Centre (IPAC) was opened in 1998, giving the school's cultural activity such as Speech & Drama, Music and Art a venue to display their talents.

Iona has a proud tradition in many cultural activities such as drama, music, art, debating and public speaking, titration and mooting.

Every year The Festival of Music, a statewide competition open to all schools is held in the Iona Performing Arts Center (IPAC). Both state and private schools are allowed to enter this competition. Iona's musical, play and band concerts all are performed here. Music at Iona College maintains a good reputation, such as the Wind Ensemble, Percussion Ensemble and Jazz Band receiving great success in their relevant fields of competition.

The school provides over 14 school bands. It can be divided into 6 categories. These include:
Concert bands (Wind Ensemble, Symphonic Winds, Concert Band, Year 6 Band, Year 5 Band)
Sympathy Orchestra
String orchestras
Vocal ensembles (Iona Singers, Ionian Voices)
Jazz ensembles (Jazz Ensembles 1, 2 and 3)
Percussion ensembles (Percussion Ensemble 1, 2 and 3)
Mass Band
Sports Band

These categories can be divided into three levels: beginner, intermediate and advanced. The bands use IPAC to perform and practice. The school also provides music lessons for students.

Iona has been very successful in public speaking with various regional, state and national representatives. The Carter Shield is an annual public speaking competition between Moreton Bay College and Iona College. 2006 celebrated the tenth year of this competition and in 2015, Iona College won the Shield for the twelfth time.

Sport 
Iona College is a member of the Associated Independent Colleges (AIC). The College offers a variety of sports including: rugby union, soccer, water polo, cricket, Australian rules football, chess, volleyball, tennis, basketball, sailing, swimming, athletics, cross country, touch football, and mountain biking. Iona College has a reputation of winning the AIC Cross Country, Athletics and Volleyball aggregates.

AIC premierships 
Iona College has won the following AIC premierships.

 Athletics (9) - 2000, 2001, 2002, 2006, 2007, 2008, 2009, 2010, 2011
 Basketball (5) - 2005, 2007, 2008, 2009, 2010
 Cricket (7) - 1999, 2000, 2004, 2006, 2007, 2012, 2016
 Cross Country (8) - 1999, 2000, 2001, 2006, 2007, 2011, 2015, 2016
 Rugby (4) - 2000, 2009, 2013, 2018
 Soccer (3) - 2015, 2017, 2018
 Swimming (2) - 2003, 2004
 Volleyball (2) - 2018, 2019

House system 
As with most Australian schools, Iona College utilises a house system. Iona currently has ten houses, many of which are named after famous oblates.  They are:

 Albini (gold) – named after Charles Albini
 Anthony (mauve) – named after Brother Anthony Kowalczyk
 Cebula (dark blue) – named after Jozef Cebula
 Charlebois (orange) – named after Ovide Charlebois
 Gérard (green) – named after Joseph Gérard
 Grandin (red) – named after Vital-Justin Grandin
 Long (blue tartan) − named after Fr Tim Long
 Mackillop (maroon) – named after Mary MacKillop
 Mazenod (light blue) – named after Eugène de Mazenod
 McAuley (grey) − named after Catherine McAuley

Many inter-house competitions are held throughout the year, such as swimming, athletics and cross-country. Although inter-house sport is an important aspect of inter-house activities, it is by no means the only area. Houses also compete in the arts and academic arenas. The winner of each competition receives points which contribute towards the Oblate Trophy.

Notable alumni 

Order of Australia recipients
 Paul Stevenson OAM – Australian psychologist
 Ashley Callus OAM – Australian former sprint freestyle swimmer, gold medal winner in the 4 × 100 m freestyle relay at the 2000 Sydney Olympics

Sport

 Graham Quinn – former Australian rugby league footballer
 Bob Lindner – former Australian rugby league footballer
 Ben Turner – Australian weightlifter, 69 kg weightlifting gold medal winner at the 2006 Commonwealth Games
 Shane Drahm – Australian former rugby union player
 Brad Wilkin – Australian rugby union player for the Melbourne Rebels
 Ed Quirk – rugby union footballer for the Chugoku Red Regulions
 Andrew Johns – British triathlete
 Dan Power – Australian-born American former rugby union player for the United States national rugby union team, rugby commentator
 Wayne Broad – former first-class cricketer for Queensland
 Jared Waerea-Hargreaves – New Zealand professional rugby league footballer, prop for the Sydney Roosters and New Zealand at international level
 David Tyrrell – former Australian rugby league footballer for the South Sydney Rabbitohs
 Mitchell Dodds – former Australian rugby league footballer, prop for the Brisbane Broncos in the NRL and the Warrington Wolves in the Super League
 Tom Hickey – Australian rules footballer for the Sydney Swans
 Tom Bell – former Australian rules footballer for Carlton and the Brisbane Lions
 Josh Thomas – former Australian rules footballer for Collingwood Football Club
 Chris McKenna – former Australian rugby league footballer

Politics
 Cr Ryan Murphy – Australian politician, councillor for Chandler Ward in Brisbane City since 2019
 Don Brown – Australian politician, Labor member for Capalaba in the Queensland Legislative Assembly since 2015
 Anthony Lynham – Australian politician and former oral and maxillofacial surgeon

Entrepreneurs
 Joe Andon – Australian businessperson, founder and CEO of Vuly Play

Entertainment
 Chris Milligan – Australian actor, known for his role as Kyle Canning in the television soap opera Neighbours

See also 
Education in Australia
Associated Independent Colleges

References

External links

Boys' schools in Queensland
Catholic secondary schools in Brisbane
Junior School Heads Association of Australia Member Schools
Catholic primary schools in Brisbane
Educational institutions established in 1958
1958 establishments in Australia